Aaron A. Cohen-Gadol (born November 23, 1970) is a professor of neurological surgery in the department of neurosurgery at Indiana University School of Medicine and a neurosurgeon at Indiana University Health specializing in the surgical treatment of complex brain tumors, vascular malformations, cavernous malformations, etc. He performs removal of brain tumors via minimally invasive endoscopic techniques, which use the nasal pathways instead of opening the skull.

In 2007, Cohen founded the Neurosurgical Atlas, a nonprofit organization, aimed at advancing the care of patients with neurosurgical disorders via introduction of novel and efficient surgical techniques into practice. As of 2023, the Atlas has over 70,000 surgeon and physician members.

Dr. Cohen is the recipient of the Vilhelm Magnus medal for his innovative efforts in advancing neurosurgical techniques.

Education
Cohen completed his undergraduate (B.A. in bioengineering) and M.D. degrees from the University of California at San Diego and Keck School of Medicine of USC, respectively. Cohen completed his residency training in neurosurgery at Mayo Clinic in Rochester, Minnesota. He also completed advanced fellowship training in two subspecialties: epilepsy surgery (Yale University) and skull base/cerebrovascular surgery (University of Arkansas Medical Sciences.) He also attained a master's degree in Clinical Research from Mayo Clinic Graduate School and an MBA from the Kelley School of Business.

Academic career
In 2006, Cohen joined the Department of Neurosurgery at Indiana University School of Medicine, where he now serves as professor of neurological surgery.

Cohen is involved in guiding and teaching fellow neurosurgeons in handling complex surgical procedures including brain tumors, arteriovenous malformations, meningiomas, cavernous malformations. , he is the Director of Neurosurgical Oncology/Brain Tumor Surgery at the Indiana University Department of Neurosurgery. Cohen is the co-founder and co-director of the Center for the Cure of Glioblastoma, part of the Indiana University School of Medicine, which facilitates new treatment options for brain tumor patients by mentoring neuroscientists and researchers.

Cohen serves as the associate editor-in-chief of Neurosurgical Focus, a journal in the field of neurosurgery. He has served on the board of directors of the American Association of Neurosurgeons (AANS) and the "Senior" Society of Neurological Surgeons (SNS). He is also a member of the American Academy of Neurological Surgery. Cohen has written and contributed to approximately 538 peer-reviewed publications.

Research and contributions
Cohen performs brain surgery for a variety of brain tumors (gliomas and meningiomas,) complex brain tumors (skull base, acoustic neuroma, and pituitary tumors,) cerebral aneurysms and arteriovenous malformations, trigeminal neuralgia and hemifacial spasm. He developed minimally invasive endoscopic techniques that allow a surgeon to remove brain tumors without opening the patient's skull, via the nasal passage, Cohen has also contributed to refining fluorescent technologies that cause a brain tumor to "glow," making it easier for the surgeon to see precisely where its margins are and be able to remove it effectively. In cooperation with the Brain Aneurysm Foundation, he created the Brain Aneurysm mobile application.

Dr. Cohen also directed the development of the Brain Digital/Virtual Twin Project, a virtual operating room platform that provides surgical rehearsal in the virtual world as well as guidance and intelligence for surgical planning. This platform is instrumental for guiding the surgeon during neurosurgery.

The Neurosurgical Atlas
Cohen is the founder, CEO, and current chief editor of the Neurosurgical Atlas (Atlas), a nonprofit organization with 70,000 surgeon and physician members. The Atlas is a collection of text, intraoperative images, illustrations, and videos that document the most difficult aspects in surgery.

He founded the American Association of Neurological Surgeons (AANS) Operative Grand Rounds in 2009, a web-based resource for training neurosurgeons. The AANS Grand Rounds apps contain a collection of videos that were produced jointly by Cohen and the Neurosurgical Atlas.

Awards and honors
Cohen was voted the Health Care Hero of the Year in the State of Indiana in 2009 for advancements in health care. He was granted the Hemispherectomy Foundation's Humanitarian award and is co-chair of the foundation's Medical Advisory Board.

Dr. Cohen is the recipient of the Vilhelm Magnus medal in the field of neurosurgery. This medal is named after Vilhelm Magnus who was the pioneer of brain surgery in Sacandinavian countries

Personal life
He volunteers to perform therapeutic surgery on dogs with brain tumors.

References

External links
 Personal website
 The Neurosurgical Atlas
 AANS Operative Grand Rounds
 Neurosurgical Atlas Video Conference Center

1970 births
Exiles of the Iranian Revolution in Pakistan
Iranian emigrants to the United States
University of California, San Diego alumni
American neurosurgeons
Living people
American people of Iranian-Jewish descent
Jewish physicians
Keck School of Medicine of USC alumni